The Grammy Award for Best Compilation Soundtrack for Visual Media has been awarded since 2000. In 2000 the award was presented as the Grammy Award for Best Soundtrack Album, and from 2001 to 2011 as Best Compilation Soundtrack Album for Motion Pictures, Television or Other Visual Media.

Since 2012, the category has been known as Best Compilation Soundtrack for Visual Media.

Years reflect the year in which the Grammy Awards were presented, for music released in the previous year. The award is presented to the artist or artists of a majority of tracks and/or the producer or producers of a majority of tracks on the album. In the absence of either, then the award goes to the individual(s) actively responsible for the musical direction of the album. Music supervisors became eligible in this category in 2019.

Recipients
The albums that do not show a specific artist were performed and credited to various artists.

See also
Grammy Award for Best Score Soundtrack for Visual Media

Notes

References

 
Film music awards
Compilation Soundtrack For Visual Media
Awards established in 2000